The 1973 National Challenge Cup was the 60th annual national open soccer championship held by the United States Soccer Football Association now known as the Lamar Hunt U.S. Open Cup.

Eastern Division

Western Division

Grand final

See also
 1973 National Amateur Cup

External links

1973 U.S. Open Cup – TheCup.us

U.S. Open Cup
Us Open
NAt